Brendan Coogan (born 17 July 1970) is a British television and radio presenter, from Middleton, Greater Manchester. In January 1999, Coogan briefly presented the BBC TV motoring programme Top Gear, following the departure of former host Jeremy Clarkson, but left after a few months, following a drunk driving conviction. Between 1999 and 2001, he was a presenter on Radio 5 Live.

From 2003 to 2004, he was a regular face on Granada Television in north-west England. In 2004, he won a Royal Television Society award for Best Presenter. Two of his brothers are comedian Steve Coogan and former singer of the Mock Turtles, Martin Coogan.

Since 2008, Brendan Coogan has been a regular presenter on BBC Radio Manchester, filling in on The Eamonn O'Neal and Jimmy Wagg Show. In April 2006, he became a presenter for the Sky One motoring show Vroom Vroom. He was the live commentator on Cirque de Celebrité on Sky One in 2006.

References

1970 births
Living people
British people of Irish descent
British television personalities
British television presenters
People from Middleton, Greater Manchester
Top Gear people
Mass media people from Manchester